There is a recognition by several groups of Kurds of the participation of their ancestors in the Armenian genocide during World War I. Some Kurdish tribes, mainly as part of the Ottoman Army , along with the Turks and other people, participated in massacres of Armenians. Other Kurds opposed the genocide, in some cases even hiding or adopting Armenian refugees. Several prominent Kurdish politicians made statements or published articles and books regarding the Armenian genocide.

Armenian genocide 

The genocide of Armenians was meticulously carried out with help from tribal Kurds who were organized into an auxiliary force called the Hamidiye Cavalry of the Ottoman government in Constantinople. Also, inmates in Ottoman prisons, including Kurds and Turks, were given amnesty and released from prison if they would massacre the Armenians.  Historian Raymond Kévorkian believes that the role of Kurds as perpetrators in the genocide has sometimes been overstated, beginning with Turkish historians eager to shift blame to Kurds. Kévorkian states that many nomadic Kurdish tribes actively participated in the genocide but settled Kurds only rarely did so.

During the Van Resistance, Armenians who left via Persia took defensive positions in Bargiri, Saray and Hosap districts of the Van Province. A refugee group following the Russian forces were intercepted by Kurdish forces when they crossed the mountain passes near the Bargiri Pass, and suffered many casualties there.

The security of the refugees had been nominally the responsibility of the Ottoman Empire. The Ottoman authorities stated that some groups of refugees were attacked by local tribes (Kurdish and Arab ), before they reached their destinations. These attacks mainly took place on the roads between Aleppo and Meskene, but it was also dangerous  from Diyarbekir to Der Zor and from Saruc to Halep on the Menbic Road. This region is heavily populated by Kurds.

 estimates that the majority of Kurds in Turkey acknowledge the Armenian genocide.

List of recognition

References

Further reading

External links 
 Kurdish legend Sivan Perwer on the Armenian Genocide
 Armenian Genocide International Recognition

Armenian genocide commemoration
Assyrian genocide
Politics of Armenia
History of Kurdistan